Jubaeopsis caffra, the Pondoland palm, is a flowering plant species in the palm family (Arecaceae). It belongs to the monotypic genus Jubaeopsis.

It is endemic to South Africa, where it is threatened due to habitat loss. This tree is a living fossil, being the last remaining lineage of the palm trees that were widespread in southern Africa in prehistoric times. A large living specimen is currently found at the Catamaran Resort in San Diego, CA.

References

Cocoseae
Monotypic Arecaceae genera
Trees of South Africa
Vulnerable plants
Taxa named by Odoardo Beccari
Taxonomy articles created by Polbot